Maxine Aldridge White (born 1951) is an American attorney and judge.  She is a judge of the Wisconsin Court of Appeals in the Milwaukee-based District I court, serving since 2020.  She is the first African-American woman to serve on the Wisconsin Court of Appeals.

White previously served 18 years as a Wisconsin Circuit Court Judge in Milwaukee County, and was chief judge for the 1st Judicial Administrative District from 2015 until her appointment to the Court of Appeals in 2020.  Earlier in her career, she was a federal prosecutor in the Eastern District of Wisconsin.

Life and career 
White was born in rural Mississippi and raised in a family of cotton sharecroppers. White received her bachelor's degree from Alcorn State University in 1973 and her master's degree from the University of Southern California in 1982. White served in the Milwaukee office of the Social Security Administration before graduating from Marquette University Law School in 1985. From 1985 to 1992, White served as an Assistant United States Attorney for the Eastern District of Wisconsin. White was the first African-American woman to serve as a federal prosecutor in the Eastern District of Wisconsin.

In 1992, White was appointed to the Wisconsin Circuit Court in Milwaukee County by then-Governor Tommy Thompson, a Republican. White served as a deputy chief judge of the court prior to 2015. In 2015, the Wisconsin Supreme Court appointed White as the court's chief judge. White is the first African-American chief judge in the court's history.  As Chief Judge, White was responsible for securing a $4.5 million grant from the MacArthur Foundation for reducing jail misuse.

In 2019, a minority of Milwaukee County Judges petitioned the Wisconsin Supreme Court to prevent her being re-appointed to another term as Chief Judge, but the Supreme Court reaffirmed her appointment.

In 2020, White was appointed to the Wisconsin Court of Appeals by Governor Tony Evers, a Democrat, succeeding the retiring Joan F. Kessler. Upon assuming office, White became the first African-American woman to serve on the Court of Appeals.

References

External links
 Judge Maxine Aldridge White at Wisconsin Court System
 Maxine White at Ballotpedia

1951 births
Living people
People from Mississippi
People from Milwaukee County, Wisconsin
Wisconsin lawyers
Wisconsin Court of Appeals judges
Wisconsin state court judges
Alcorn State University alumni
University of Southern California alumni
Marquette University Law School alumni
African-American judges
20th-century American judges
21st-century American judges
20th-century American women judges
21st-century American women judges
20th-century African-American women
20th-century African-American people
21st-century African-American women
21st-century African-American people